The two-coloured thick-toed gecko (Pachydactylus bicolor) is a species of lizard in the family Gekkonidae. It is endemic to Namibia.

References

Endemic fauna of Namibia
Pachydactylus
Reptiles described in 1926
Reptiles of Namibia